Rodrigo Ezequiel Díaz (born 28 August 1981) is an Argentine former footballer who played as an attacking midfielder. Díaz nickname was El Rengo, the Spanish word for lame or one-legged.

References

External links
 Díaz at Football–Lineups
 

1981 births
Living people
People from Moreno Partido
Sportspeople from Buenos Aires Province
Argentine footballers
Association football midfielders
Club Atlético Lanús footballers
Deportivo Toluca F.C. players
Club Atlético Independiente footballers
Club Atlético Colón footballers
Argentinos Juniors footballers
Club Atlético Huracán footballers
Independiente Rivadavia footballers
Club Almirante Brown footballers
Deportes Iquique footballers
Deportivo Morón footballers
All Boys footballers
Chilean Primera División players
Argentine Primera División players
Primera Nacional players
Liga MX players
Argentine expatriate footballers
Expatriate footballers in Chile
Expatriate footballers in Brazil
Expatriate footballers in Mexico